Bobe may be:
Wovea language
Bube language
Nouri language